The 1990 Supercoppa Italiana was a pre-season football match contested by the 1989–90 Serie A winners Napoli and the 1989–90 Coppa Italia winners Juventus.

The match resulted in a 5–1 win for Napoli.

Match details

See also 

 Juventus F.C.–S.S.C. Napoli rivalry

References

1990
Supercoppa 1990
Supercoppa 1990
Supercoppa Italiana
Football in Naples